Anil Kumar Singh is an Indian politician of the Bharatiya Janata Party. He is a member of the 18th Uttar Pradesh Assembly, representing the Purwa constituency (Unnao)

References 

 "Anil Kumar Singh in Uttar Pradesh election PURWA (UNNAO)" myneta.info. Retrieved in 4 January 2023
 "Anil Kumar Singh BJP | Purwa | Uttar Pradesh" News 18. 
 "Anil Kumar Singh MLA of PURWA Uttar Pradesh" Nocorruption.

1979 births
Uttar Pradesh MLAs 2022–2027
Bharatiya Janata Party politicians from Uttar Pradesh
Living people